Penelope is a 2006 British-American fantasy romantic comedy film directed by Mark Palansky and starring Christina Ricci, James McAvoy, Catherine O'Hara, Peter Dinklage, Richard E. Grant, and Reese Witherspoon (who also produced the movie). The film tells the story of the titular Penelope Wilhern, who is born with the snout of a pig due to a curse that was placed on her family by a vengeful witch.

Plot 

A servant woman named Clara falls in love with wealthy socialite Ralph Wilhern and becomes pregnant with his child, only to commit suicide when Ralph's family disapproves of their marriage. Clara's mother, a vengeful witch, curses the next Wilhern daughter to be born with the snout of a pig; the curse may only be broken when "one of her own kind" learns to love her. For generations, only sons are born into the family, until Penelope Wilhern (Christina Ricci). Ashamed of her daughter's pig face, Penelope's mother Jessica (Catherine O'Hara) claims Penelope died shortly after her birth and shuts her away in their mansion. Once Penelope turns 18, her parents begin attempting to find her a potential husband, interpreting the curse's counter as the love of a man of equal social status.

For the next seven years, all of Penelope's suitors flee in terror upon seeing her face, including Edward Humphrey Vanderman III (Simon Woods). Conspiring with tabloid reporter Lemon (Peter Dinklage) to photograph Penelope's face, Vanderman pays young blue blood Max Campion (James McAvoy) to pose as a new suitor for Penelope, hiding a camera in his jacket. After having conversations through a one-way mirror, Max and Penelope develop genuine feelings for each other; however, when Max sees her face, he is shocked (but not frightened) and accidentally triggers the camera. Regretful about his attempts to exploit Penelope, Max calls off his agreement with Lemon and Vanderman (though Jessica and matchmaker Wanda catch him doing so) and destroys the camera. Penelope begs Max to marry her, promising it will lift the curse, but he declines.

Tired of the match-making and inspired by Max's conversations about the outside world, Penelope flees home and journeys out into the city, selling photos of herself to Lemon while covering her nose with a scarf in public to keep anonymous. She is spotted by her parents and runs back to the bar she frequents before passing out, leading her friend Annie (Reese Witherspoon) to remove the scarf and reveal her as the elusive Penelope to the other guests. Penelope becomes an overnight celebrity, gaining adoring fans who are not disgusted by her face.

Meanwhile, Edward’s father, having seen the public's fondness for Penelope and embarrassed by his son's vocal cruelty toward her, coerces Edward into proposing to her. Lemon eventually discovers that the real Max Campion is imprisoned for armed robbery; the Campion they have been working with is actually a man named Johnny Martin. Lemon relays this to Jessica and Wanda, but Jessica chooses not to let Penelope know the truth. During her wedding, Penelope realizes that she does not want to marry simply to break the curse and that she likes herself the way she is. This breaks the curse, as Penelope has been loved by "one of her own kind" – herself – and her pig snout and ears disappear.

Years later, Penelope becomes an elementary school horticulture teacher, and the public's interest in her dissipates. She eventually learns from Wanda the truth about Johnny. She reunites with Johnny, who is unaware that the curse was broken, at a Halloween party while wearing a mask. Johnny kisses Penelope, and she takes off her mask, revealing to him that she had the power to lift the curse all along.

The Wilhern butler, Jake, is revealed to be the witch who cast the original curse, and casts one final spell to render Jessica permanently mute before quitting his position. While Johnny and Penelope are at a park, Lemon discreetly approaches the two and attempts to take a photo to prove that Penelope's curse has been lifted, but ultimately decides against it upon seeing how happy they are, and leaves them alone.

Cast

 Christina Ricci as Penelope Wilhern, an ugly woman who was born with the face of a pig
 Andi-Marie Townsend portrays a younger Penelope Wilhern
 James McAvoy as John "Johnny" Martin, a man who uses the alias of "Max Campion"
 Nick Frost plays the real Max Campion, a man who was cut off from his family due to his gambling problems
 Catherine O'Hara as Jessica Wilhern, the mother of Penelope
 Peter Dinklage as Lemon, a tabloid reporter who plans to reveal Penelope's existence
 Richard E. Grant as Franklin Wilhern, the father of Penelope
 Reese Witherspoon as Annie, a delivery girl who befriends Penelope
 Ronni Ancona as Wanda, a matchmaker
 Simon Woods as Edward Humphrey Vanderman III, a former suitor of Penelope who allies with Lemon
 Nigel Havers as Edward Vanderman II, the father of Edward Vanderman III
 Burn Gorman as Larry
 Russell Brand as Sam
 John Voce as Duty Cop
 Lenny Henry as Krull
 Richard Leaf as Jack, the bartender of a bar which is frequented by Annie
 Michael Feast as Jake, a butler who works for the Wilhern family
 Michael Feast also portrays the true form of the Witch who cursed the Wilhern family

Background and production
The production of Penelope started in January 2006 in London and Pinewood Studios, Buckinghamshire. The film's screenplay was written by Leslie Caveny. A novelization of the film was written by Marilyn Kaye. It premiered at the 2006 Toronto International Film Festival. It was also Reese Witherspoon's first film in a producing role along with a small acting role.
Shortly after, IFC Films acquired U.S. distribution rights to the film, with The Weinstein Company handling the home media and television distribution, with a planned mid-2007 release. Summit Entertainment eventually picked up United States distribution rights.

Reception

Critical response
The film received mixed reviews from critics. Review aggregation website Rotten Tomatoes gives the film 53% based on 128 reviews. The site's consensus reads "Though Penelope has a charming cast and an appealing message, it ultimately suffers from faulty narrative and sloppy direction." Metacritic gives the film a weighted average rating of 48%, based on 29 reviews — indicating mixed or average reviews.

Box office
The film premiered September 8, 2006 at the Toronto International Film Festival. It was also shown at the Cannes Film Festival in May 2007. The film opened in Russia and Ukraine in August 2007. Penelope was released in the United Kingdom on February 1, 2008. It opened in wide release in the United States and Canada on February 29, 2008.

The film opened in ninth place and earned $3.8 million USD on its opening weekend in the United States.

By October 5, 2008, the film had grossed $20.8 million worldwide—with $6.5 million in the United Kingdom, Ireland, and Malta.

Home media 
Penelope was released on DVD and Blu-Ray on July 15, 2008 in the United States. It included a 2:35:1 anamorphic widescreen, and an English Dolby Digital 5.1 Surround track. The extras were a behind-the-scenes featurette, cast and crew, production notes and world-premiere features from the upcoming Summit film Twilight as well as behind-the-scenes features and interviews from the film, released four months later.  Only the German Blu-Ray version of the film, released in 2011, carries the full 104 minute version of the film.  US and UK releases of the film are all the edited 88/89 minute cut.

Soundtrack
Joby Talbot composed the music for the film. A soundtrack album was released.

References

External links

2006 films
British romantic comedy films
British fantasy films
2006 romantic comedy films
American fantasy comedy films
American romantic comedy films
Films about dysfunctional families
Films about human rights
Films directed by Mark Palansky
American independent films
Summit Entertainment films
Films shot at Pinewood Studios
British independent films
Love stories
Films about curses
Films based on European myths and legends
Films produced by Reese Witherspoon
Films shot in London
Films set in London
Films about missing people
Pig-faced women
Films about witchcraft
2006 directorial debut films
2000s English-language films
2000s American films
2000s British films